Dawid Bezuidenhout is a high school in the suburb of Khomasdal in Windhoek, the capital of Namibia. It is a government owned school with approximately 1300 learners and 43 teachers. The school was named after Dawid Bezuidenhout who was a teacher and Minister of Transport of the Transitional Government of National Unity.

Dawid Bezuidenhout High School, a school formerly for Coloured learners, was established in 1985 by the Coloured Representative Authority and will turn forty in 2023. Today the school populace is a mixed one. The school is located at the corner of Andrew Kloppers Street and Paul van Hartes Road in Francoistown, Khomasdal.

See also
 List of schools in Namibia
 Education in Namibia

References

Schools in Windhoek